Foxy Brown may refer to:

 Foxy Brown (film), a 1974 blaxploitation film
 Foxy Brown (rapper) (born 1978), stage name of American hip hop emcee 
 Foxy Brown (singer) (active since 1989), stage name of Jamaican dancehall reggae singer

Brown, Foxy